Julien Le Cardinal (born 3 August 1997) is a French professional footballer who plays as a centre-back for  club Lens.

Career 
Julien Le Cardinal made his first appearances in Ligue 2 with Bastia in 2019.

On 15 November 2022, Le Cardinal signed for Ligue 1 club Lens on a contract until 2025. The transfer fee paid to Paris FC was reportedly of €2.3 million, with an additional €300,000 in bonuses. He was given the number 25 jersey.

Career statistics

Honours 
Stade Briochin
 Championnat de France Amateur 2: 2016–17

Bastia
 Championnat National: 2020–21

References

External links 
 SC Bastia profile
 

1997 births
Living people
Sportspeople from Saint-Brieuc
Footballers from Brittany
French footballers
Association football central defenders
En Avant Guingamp players
Stade Briochin players
SC Bastia players
Paris FC players
RC Lens players
Championnat National 3 players
Championnat National 2 players
Championnat National players
Ligue 2 players